Bradford Clean Air Zone is a road traffic low-emission programme in the City of Bradford in West Yorkshire, England. Plans were advanced for many cities in England to have clean air zones (CAZ), but of the ones put forward in Yorkshire, only Bradford's CAZ has been taken to an operational stage. The scheme commenced on 26 September 2022, and all vehicles, barring private cars and motorbikes, must be compliant with the scheme or face a charge for entering into the zone. The programme aims to help the district comply with legal limits for air quality.

History 
Plans were developed in the late 2010s for several Yorkshire cities to have "clean air zones" (CAZ) – Bradford, Leeds, Sheffield, and whilst the latter two have postponed their plans, Bradford Council have pressed ahead with theirs, which gained approval in March 2021 for a launch in January of the following year. The scheme in Leeds was halted due to an unexpected fall in nitrous oxide levels. This fall was attributed to the COVID-19 pandemic lockdowns, which resulted in less traffic on the region's roads. The programme is to help combat pollution within the city (and wider district) which has been ordered, by ministerial direction, to reduce pollution levels being beyond legal limits for air quality. The area within the zone around Bradford City Centre follows the line of the A6177 city ring road. The northern section includes Canal Road and the A650 road to the Bingley bypass, including Saltaire and most of Shipley up to the Fox Corner Junction in Shipley.

It was revealed in 2021, that Bradford Council had been given £39.3 million of UK Government money to implement the scheme and to allow grants to be awarded to users such as taxi firms, minibus and bus firms, and hauliers, allowing them to adapt existing vehicles to greener emission status, or to procure new vehicles entirely. By September 2022, 87% of taxis in the city were compliant with the new clean air zone, 370 buses had been upgraded for compliance, and 33 new electric buses had been procured to work routes in and out of the city centre.

Locally, Bradford Council have presented the clean air zone programme under the title of "Breathe better Bradford" (stylized as breathe better BRADFORD). The introduction of the CAZ has led to a research programme being launched (known as Born in Bradford), which is run by the University of Leeds, and aims to track pollution and the health and well-being of Bradfordians. The scheme was welcomed by campaigners for cleaner air, with one group, Asthma and Lung UK stating that Bradford had the worst hospitalisation rate in Yorkshire of children with breathing difficulties. However, some protested a tax on vehicles entering the city, stating that the cost would "cripple small businesses particularly at a time when people are struggling with the cost of living crisis." The director of the Bradford Institute for Health Research pointed out that "..almost half the schools in Bradford will be in the Clean Air Zone, and so our children will be shielded from the toxic effects of traffic-related air pollution."

Initially set to be launched in January 2022, the project was delayed, and went live on 26 September 2022. The delays to the rollout were criticised by some taxi firms, who said that drivers had been forced to take out extensive short term loans so that they could upgrade their cars for the deadline in January, only for the scheme to be pushed back to spring 2022.

Charging 
The UK Government has set out the definitions of four schemes (labelled as A, B, C, and D. Bradford opted for a C-scheme (meaning it is referred to as a C-CAZ), which would see charges for all vehicles except for private cars and motorbikes. ANPR cameras have been installed around the city centre, and along the Shipley/Bradford corridor, to monitor vehicles entering the zone. At the launch in September 2022, drivers of buses and HGVs which did not conform to the approved ratings would be fined £50, vans and minibuses £9, and taxis £7. For each fine doled out, the UK Government would be paid £2. The charging time is to be classified as a day from midnight to midnight, not 24 hours from when a vehicle enters the zone. However, vehicles can leave and re-enter the zone several times between the midnight to midnight period, and only be charged once.

In December 2022, it was revealed that over £1.8 million in charges had been accrued from fines and levies over a twelve week period from the start date in September. Over £180,000 of which would be paid to central government under the charging scheme, the rest would be ring-fenced by Bradford City Council for anti-emission projects.

Notes

References

External links 

Map of the Bradford Clean Air Zone
Charging scalar

Environmental law in the United Kingdom
Air pollution in the United Kingdom
Motoring taxation in the United Kingdom
Electronic toll collection
Road congestion charge schemes in the United Kingdom
Transport policy in the United Kingdom
City of Bradford